KNZR-FM (97.7 MHz) is a commercial radio station licensed to Shafter, California, and broadcasting to the Bakersfield radio market. KNZR-FM airs a talk radio format simulcast with co-owned AM 1560 KNZR.  It is owned by Alpha Media, LLC, through licensee Alpha Media Licensee LLC.  The studios and offices are on Pegasus Drive in Bakersfield.

KNZR-FM has an effective radiated power (ERP) of 4,100 watts.  It is a Class A FM station, limited to the communities in and adjacent to Bakersfield.  The transmitter is off Warehouse Road in Oildale.

Programming
The schedule on KNZR-AM-FM is mostly syndicated conservative talk shows.  Weekdays begin with The Glenn Beck Program followed by The Rush Limbaugh Show, The Sean Hannity Show, The Mark Levin Show, Coast to Coast AM with George Noory and Hugh Hewitt.

On weekends, syndicated shows include Handel On The Law with Bill Handel, Somewhere in Time with Art Bell and The Tech Guy with Leo Laporte.  Most hours begin with world and national news from Fox News Radio. The only local show on the weekends is the very highly rated Crusin' to the Oldies, hosted by Lugnut Larry Thomas. Crusin' to the Oldies features a wide variety of classic rock, pop, soul and R&B music from the 1950' through the 1970's. It's known to draw more listeners than many of the weekday programs.

History

Early years
The station signed on the air on March 3, 1978 as KQEZ.  The following year, it switched its call sign to KMGN, airing a country music format.  The station was owned by Brandon-Dorsey Communications.

In 1986, Community Service Broadcasters took over as debtor in possession.  The call letters switched to KKBB and the station featured an album rock sound, using NBC Radio's "The Source" young adult network for news and features.  In 1996, the station switched to a Regional Mexican format as KRME, when it was owned by Spanish-language broadcaster Eduardo Caballero.

The station was assigned the KSMJ call letters by the Federal Communications Commission on February 6, 2001.  As its call sign implies, the station carried a smooth jazz format.

Changes in ownership
Buckley Broadcasting acquired KSMJ in 2001.  Buckley decided to pair 97.7 FM with AM 1560, to give Bakersfield listeners the choice to hear the talk programming on KNZR on either AM or FM.  KSMJ changed to its current KNZR-FM call sign on September 11, 2013.  The two stations began simulcasting around the clock.

In 2014, Buckley Broadcasting sold its California stations, including KNZR-AM-FM, to Alpha Media of Portland, Oregon.  Alpha Media Chairman Larry Wilson said, "The Buckley clusters in California will be a great addition to the West Coast footprint.  Bakersfield is a rich and vibrant city full of live and local opportunities."

Racial controversy

On January 18, 2018, Midday host Jaz McKay was told that due to budgetary concerns he would be replaced the next week with Sean Hannity in the noon to 3pm slot which he had occupied for 14 years. McKay then took to social media and used derogatory language to describe Hispanic radio broadcasts in the area. McKay claimed the large number of Spanish language radio stations in Bakersfield made it increasingly difficult for English speaking announcers to find employment. At 45.5%, Hispanics comprise the largest demographic group in Bakersfield. On January 24, McKay’s time slot was indeed taken over by the syndicated radio show from Sean Hannity. On the same day, it was also reported that McKay’s fellow conservative talk show host Inga Barks was, for unspecified reasons, no longer associated with the station.

McKay was later hired for the 10:00 a.m. to 2:00 p.m. time slot on KERN 1180 AM & 96.1 FM, in December, 2018.  KERN 1180, KNZR's chief talk radio competitor, is owned by American General Media.

Former programming
 The station was once home to Chris Squires. He had been Program Director for KKXX-FM, KRAB, KKDJ, and KSMJ when they were owned by Mondosphere Broadcasting, and was known as on-air name "Spydee."  He was also program director for Mix 97-7.
 Kristin Jacobs was former;y on the mid-day shift, and had been on the radio in Bakersfield doing the same shift on Clear Channel-owned KKDJ (when it was "K-LITE 105.3").
 Erik Daniels was on in the afternoons, and had been a Buckley Radio employee for many years, also serving on KLLY, and doing production director duties for the company.
 The Beacon Radio program with Austin Harris once aired Sunday mornings.
 Weekends Fill/In included Rogers Brandon.
 Brent Michaels hosted the morning show until August 22, 2008.
 The syndicated morning program The Bob and Sheri Show debuted September 2008.
 The station carried the syndicated John Tesh radio program on weekday evenings and Sunday mornings until January, 2011.  He is now on KBFP-FM

Previous logos

References

External links
KNZR official website

Radio stations established in 1978
1978 establishments in California
News and talk radio stations in the United States
NZR-FM
Alpha Media radio stations